Vuelta a la Comunidad de Madrid is a stage road bicycle race held annually in and around Madrid, Spain. Between 2005 and 2012, the race was organised as a 2.1 event on the UCI Europe Tour. In 2013 the event was organised as a single-day race, for economical reasons.

Winners

Under-23 race
An version of the race reserved for riders under 23 years old has been held intermittently since 2008. In 2011 and 2013, the race was part of the UCI Europe Tour as a 2.2U category event.

References

External links
 

 
UCI Europe Tour races
Recurring sporting events established in 1983
1983 establishments in Spain
Madrid
Sport in the Community of Madrid